Industrial may refer to:

Industry
 Industrial archaeology, the study of the history of the industry
 Industrial engineering, engineering dealing with the optimization of complex industrial processes or systems
 Industrial city, a city dominated by one or more industries
 Industrial loan company, a financial institution in the United States that lends money, and may be owned by non-financial institutions
 Industrial organization, a field that builds on the theory of the firm by examining the structure and boundaries between firms and markets
 Industrial Revolution, the development of industry in the 18th and 19th centuries
 Industrial society, a society that has undergone industrialization
 Industrial technology, a broad field that includes designing, building, optimizing, managing and operating industrial equipment, and predesignated as acceptable for industrial uses, like factories
 Industrial video, a video that targets “industry” as its primary audience
 Industrialization, the societal process and period of developing such technology and transforming into such societies

Arts and entertainment

Music
 Industrial (album), debut album by Pitchshifter
 Industrial music, the genre of music that draws on transgressive and provocative themes
 Industrial dance, a subgenre characterized by electronic beats, symphonic keyboard lines, pile-driver rhythms, angst-ridden or sampled vocals, and cyberpunk imagery
 Industrial metal, a fusion genre characterized by repeating metal guitar riffs, sampling, synthesizer or sequencer lines, and distorted vocals
 Industrial rock, a fusion genre characterized by electric guitars, drums, and bass paired with white noise blasts and electronic music gear, such as synthesizers, sequencers, samplers and drum machines
 Industrial Records, a record label established in 1976 by the industrial music group and performance artists, Throbbing Gristle

Other uses in the arts
 Industrial architecture, pre-modern style of building design
 Industrial musical, a bespoke musical theatre performance for a company's employees
 industrial style, 21st-century interior design aesthetic

Other uses
 Industrial, West Virginia, an unincorporated community
 Industrial Township, St. Louis County, Minnesota
 Two functional constituencies in the elections for the Legislative Council of Hong Kong:
 Industrial (First)
 Industrial (Second)
 Industrial (Mexibús, Line 1), a BRT station in Ecatepec, Mexico
 Industrial (Mexibús, Line 4), a BRT station in Ecatepec, Mexico
 Industrial piercing, any two pierced ear holes connected with a single straight piece of jewelry

See also
 Industry (disambiguation)
 Industrial group (disambiguation)
 Industria (disambiguation)